Fabio Tuiach (born 4 June 1980) is an Italian professional boxer and former kickboxer.

Early life and amateur career
Tuiach was born in Trieste, Italy and he grew up in Rozzol Melara, a quartier in the north of the city. He began boxing at 16 years old, under the guidance of the former Italian featherweight champion Nevio Carbi. He made his debut as a cruiserweight with a win in 80 seconds. He won fifteen matches in a row by KO or TKO, afterwards he climbed in the light heavyweight category where he won the Italian Juniores Title. He was called up to the Italian National Team and in 2000 he won the Italian Second-Class Super Heavyweight Title and in the next year he loss against Roberto Cammarelle at the All-Italy Boxing Championship final.

In 2003 he turned professional, he closed his amateur career with 60 matches fought, 45 won, including 13 by KO.

Professional career
Tuiach made his professional debut on 30 April 2004 in Bergamo and he won by KO against the Slovak Marian Miko.

On 10 February 2006, with 11 matches won, 7 by KO, he got the chance to fight for the Italian Title and he faced the Italian champion Paolo Ferrara in Trieste. He won by KO at the seventh round after an intense match, bringing back in Trieste a title that was missing for thirty years, when was won by his first master Nevio Carbi in the featherweight division.

In 2007 he won the IBF Mediterranean cruiserweight title beating by KO the Frenchman Enis Boussandel. In 2008 a family bereavement upset his life and his career resented of that.

On 25 October 2008, he fought for the European title, but he fell to the mat under the punches of the champion Marco Huck. At the visits of reinstatement the Italian federation denied his medical fitness, in 2009 he repeated the tests but the outcome was the same: after this disappointment, he left boxing and started the practice of kickboxing. In this short period he fought 4 matches, 2 wins (1 by KO) and 2 losses, he left definitively the ring in 2011.

He returned in boxing on July 14, 2012, fighting against the Hungarian Sandor Balagh after 4 years of inactivity, going up into the heavyweight division.

In August 2013 he issued the challenge to the Italian title but he lost by TKO at the sixth round against Matteo Modugno.
In December 2014 he finally won the Italian Heavyweight Title beating Gianluca Mandras, disqualified at the ninth round, in Trieste.

He lost the Italian heavyweight title on June 13, 2015 in Brescia. Afterwards he had to leave the title to the former Italian Cruiserweight champion Salvatore Erittu.

Championships

Professional
2014 Italian Heavyweight Title
2007 I.B.F. Mediterranean Cruiserweight Title.
2006 Italian Light Heavyweight Title.

Amatorial
2001 All-Italy Boxing Championship Heavyweight Division Runner-up.
2000 Italian Second-Class Super Heavyweight Title.
Italian Juniores Light Heavyweight Champion.

Boxing record

| style="text-align:center;" colspan="8"|27 Wins (15 knockouts, 12 decisions),  4 Losses (2 knockouts, 2 decisions), 0 Draws
|- style="text-align:center;" colspan="8"
|-  style="text-align:center; background:#e3e3e3;"
|  style="border-style:none none solid solid; "|Res.
|  style="border-style:none none solid solid; "|Record
|  style="border-style:none none solid solid; "|Opponent
|  style="border-style:none none solid solid; "|Type
|  style="border-style:none none solid solid; "|Rd., Time
|  style="border-style:none none solid solid; "|Date
|  style="border-style:none none solid solid; "|Location
|  style="border-style:none none solid solid; "|Notes
|- align=center
|Loss
|align=center|27–5||align=left| Michael Wallisch
|
|
|
|align=left|
|align=left|
|- align=center
|Loss
|align=center|27–4||align=left| Salvatore Erittu
|
|
|
|align=left|
|align=left|
|- align=center
|Win
|align=center|27–3||align=left| Gianluca Mandras
|
|
|
|align=left|
|align=left|
|- align=center
|Win
|align=center|26–3||align=left| Hrvoje Kisicek
|
|
|
|align=left|
|align=left|
|- align=center
|Loss
|align=center|25–3||align=left| Matteo Modugno
|
|
|
|align=left|
|align=left|
|- align=center
|Win
|align=center|25–2||align=left| Sandor Balogh
|
|
|
|align=left|
|align=left|
|- align=center
|Win
|align=center|24–2||align=left| Kreso Bogdanović
|
|
|
|align=left|
|align=left|
|- align=center
|Win
|align=center|23–2||align=left| Sandor Balogh
|
|
|
|align=left|
|align=left|
|- align=center
|Loss
|align=center|22–2||align=left| Marco Huck
|
|
|
|align=left|
|align=left|
|- align=center
|Win
|align=center|22–1||align=left| Walter Palacios
|
|
|
|align=left|
|align=left|
|- align=center
|Win
|align=center|21–1||align=left| Drazen Ordulj
|
|
|
|align=left|
|align=left|
|- align=center
|Win
|align=center|20–1||align=left| Tomáš Mrázek
|
|
|
|align=left|
|align=left|
|- align=center
|Win
|align=center|19–1||align=left| Enis Boussandel
|
|
|
|align=left|
|align=left|
|- align=center
|Win
|align=center|18–1||align=left| David Vicena
|
|
|
|align=left|
|align=left|
|- align=center
|Win
|align=center|17–1||align=left| Slavomir Selicky
|
|
|
|align=left|
|align=left|
|- align=center
|Win
|align=center|16–1||align=left| Paolo Ferrara
|
|
|
|align=left|
|align=left|
|- align=center
|Win
|align=center|15–1||align=left| David Vicena
|
|
|
|align=left|
|align=left|
|- align=center
|- align=center
|Win
|align=center|14–1||align=left| Simone Loschi
|
|
|
|align=left|
|align=left|
|- align=center
|- align=center
|Loss
|align=center|13–1||align=left| Pavol Polakovič
|
|
|
|align=left|
|align=left|
|- align=center
|Win
|align=center|13–0||align=left| Rene Huebner
|
|
|
|align=left|
|align=left|
|- align=center
|Win
|align=center|12–0||align=left| Paolo Ferrara
|
|
|
|align=left|
|align=left|
|- align=center
|Win
|align=center|11–0||align=left| Massimiliano Costantino
|
|
|
|align=left|
|align=left|
|- align=center
|Win
|align=center|10–0||align=left| Massimiliano Costantino
|
|
|
|align=left|
|align=left|
|- align=center
|Win
|align=center|9–0||align=left| Roger Foe
|
|
|
|align=left|
|align=left|
|- align=center
|Win
|align=center|8–0||align=left| Otto Nemeth
|
|
|
|align=left|
|align=left|
|- align=center
|Win
|align=center|7–0||align=left| Marian Tudor
|
|
|
|align=left|
|align=left|
|- align=center
|Win
|align=center|6–0||align=left| Branko Gacević
|
|
|
|align=left|
|align=left|
|- align=center
|Win
|align=center|5–0||align=left| Siniša Puljak
|
|
|
|align=left|
|align=left|
|- align=center
|Win
|align=center|4–0||align=left| Gabor Farkas
|
|
|
|align=left|
|align=left|
|- align=center
|Win
|align=center|3–0||align=left| Leon Nzama
|
|
|
|align=left|
|align=left|
|- align=center
|Win
|align=center|2–0||align=left| Mohammed Quarab
|
|
|
|align=left|
|align=left|
|- align=center
|Win
|align=center|1–0||align=left| Marian Miko
|
|
|
|align=left|
|align=left|

Kickboxing record

|-  bgcolor="#FFBBBB"
| 2011-02-25 || Loss ||align=left| Rok Štrucl || Trieste Fight Night || Trieste, Italy || Extra Round Decision || 4 || 3:00
|-  bgcolor="#CCFFCC"
| 2010-11-13 || Win ||align=left| Adis Dadović || Trieste Fight Night || Trieste, Italy || KO || 2 || 1:18
|-  bgcolor="#FFBBBB"
| 2009-08-17 || Loss ||align=left| Fabio Giannasi || Gotti Promotions || Trieste, Italy || Retirement || 2 || 0:00
|-  bgcolor="#CCFFCC"
| 2009-04-24 || Win ||align=left| Thomas Joaquin || Gotti Promotions || Trieste, Italy || Decision (Unanimous) || 3 || 3:00
|-
|-
| colspan=9 | Legend:

References

External links
 

Sportspeople from Trieste
Cruiserweight boxers
Heavyweight boxers
Italian male boxers
Living people
1980 births